Next Space Technologies for Exploration Partnerships (NextSTEP) is a NASA program using a public-private partnership model that seeks commercial development of deep space exploration capabilities to support more extensive human space flight missions in the Proving Ground around and beyond cislunar space—the space near Earth that extends just beyond the Moon.

Program overview 
NextSTEP is a public-private partnership model that seeks commercial development of deep space exploration capabilities to support more extensive human space flight missions in the Proving Ground around and beyond cislunar space—the space near Earth that extends just beyond the Moon.

NASA issued the original NextSTEP Broad Agency Announcement (BAA) to U.S. industry in late 2014, and issued the second NextSTEP BAA in April 2016.

An important part of NASA's strategy is to stimulate the commercial space industry to help the agency achieve its strategic goals and objectives for expanding the frontiers of knowledge, capability, and opportunities in space. A key component of the NextSTEP partnership model is that it provides an opportunity for NASA and industry to partner to develop capabilities that meet NASA human space exploration objectives while also supporting industry commercialization plans.

NASA hopes to incorporate modules and parts developed in the NextSTEP project into the follow on Lunar Gateway and Deep Space Transport projects.

Phases

NextSTEP (first selection) 
In April 2015 the first NextSTEP selection by NASA selected 12 Partnerships to advance concept studies and technology development projects in the areas of advanced propulsion, habitation and small satellites.

Selected advanced electric propulsion projects developed propulsion technology systems in the  range to meet the needs of a variety of deep space mission concepts. The three NextSTEP advanced propulsion projects, $400,000 to $3.5 million per year per award, were limited to a three-year performance period focused on ground testing efforts. The selected companies were:
 Ad Astra Rocket Company of Webster, Texas
 Aerojet Rocketdyne of Redmond, Washington
 MSNW of Redmond, Washington

These selections were intended to augment the Orion capsule with the development of capabilities to initially sustain a crew of four for up to 60 days in cis-lunar space with the ability to scale up to transit habitation capabilities for future Mars missions. The selected projects addressed concepts and, in some cases, provide advancement in technologies related to habitation and operations, or environmental control and life support capabilities of a habitation system. The seven NextSTEP habitat projects had initial performance periods of up to 12 months, at a value of $400,000 to $1 million for the study and development efforts, with the potential for follow-on phases to be defined during the initial phase. The selected companies were:
 Bigelow Aerospace LLC of North Las Vegas, Nevada
 The Boeing Company of Pasadena, Texas
 Dynetics Inc. of Huntsville, Alabama
 Hamilton Sundstrand Space Systems International of Windsor Locks, Connecticut
 Lockheed Martin Space Systems Company of Denver, Colorado
 Orbital ATK of Dulles, Virginia
 Orbital Technologies Corporation of Madison, Wisconsin

The CubeSat projects selected in the award were expected to fly as secondary payload missions on the first flight of the Space Launch System, Artemis 1. CubeSat selections addressed NASA's strategic knowledge gaps reducing risk, increasing effectiveness, and improving the design of robotic and human space exploration.

The two NextSTEP CubeSat projects had fixed-price contracts with technical and payment milestones and total values for the entire development and operations of $1.4 to $7.9 million per award. The selected companies were:
 Lockheed Martin Space Systems Company of Denver, Colorado
 Morehead State University of Morehead, Kentucky

NextSTEP activities were executed through fixed-price contracts with milestone payments, combined with corporate-resource contributions. The selected partner provided overall study and technology development efforts, benefiting NASA and future commercial endeavors.

NextSTEP-2

Habitation systems

Starting in September 2016 under NextSTEP-2 Appendix A six companies were given approximately 24 months to develop ground prototypes or conduct concept studies for a Deep Space Habitat. Habitation systems provide a safe place for humans to live as humans move beyond Earth, especially in the context of the Moon to Mars. 
The selected companies were:
 Bigelow Aerospace of Las Vegas
 Boeing of Pasadena, Texas
 Lockheed Martin of Denver
 Orbital ATK of Dulles, Virginia
 Sierra Nevada Corporation's Space Systems of Louisville, Colorado
 NanoRacks of Webster, Texas

In August 2016 NASA estimated the combined total of all the awards, covering work in 2016 and 2017, would be approximately $65 million, with additional efforts and funding continuing into 2018. Partners were required to contribute at least 30 percent of the cost of the overall proposed effort.

In January 2018 Sierra Nevada Corporation (SNC) was granted a contract modification permitting the development of advanced bio-based life support and food production systems at SNC's Madison, Wisconsin offices. The aim is to produce plant-based modules that can recycle drinking water from waste water streams, regenerate oxygen from carbon dioxide, produce fresh food for astronauts, and support radiation protection of the crew while on deep exploration missions, such as missions to Mars.

ISRU, FabLab
In December 2017 NASA issued several sets of announcements, contracts and Space Act Agreements (SAA).

In the first NASA issued a broad agency announcement (BAA) requesting "proposals for trade studies and design, fabrication, and testing of critical components and subsystems for acquisition and processing of extraterrestrial resources into water, oxygen, and fuel." NASA expects to issue multiple fixed price contracts for small amounts in phased approaches for up to 5 years. Cost sharing and/or investment matching will be required.

In the second a total of $10.2 million was awarded over 18 months for development of prototype equipment for use in its FabLab. The machines will perform space based on-demand fabrication.  The proposals for development of a first-generation, in-space, multi-material fabrication laboratory (FabLab) for space missions were solicited in May 2017 under Appendix B of the NextSTEP-2 Broad Agency Announcement. 
The 3 award winners were:
 Interlog Corporation of Anaheim, California
 Techshot Inc. of Greeneville, Indiana
 Tethers Unlimited Inc. of Bothell

Human landing systems (Moon)

In December 2018 NASA announced that it was issuing a formal request for proposals as Appendix E of NextSTEP-2 allowing American companies to submit bids for the design and development of new reusable systems allowing astronauts to land on the lunar surface. On February 14, 2019, NASA hosted an Industry Forum at NASA HQ to provide an overview of the Human Landing System (HLS) BAA.

In April 2019 NASA announced a formal request for proposals for Appendix H of NextSTEP-2 allowing American companies to submit bids for the design and development of the Ascent Element of the Human Landing System (HLS) including the cabin used during landings. This was later extended to cover the entire lander - descent element, ascent element and transfer vehicle.

NextSTEP-3 
Phase 3 ends with Deployment and Operational Status of Deep Space Habitation and Habitation Systems.

Deep Space Transport 
This project is to develop a vehicle with crewed solar electric propulsion and able to fly to Mars orbit. It is a follow on project using some of the hardware, software and systems developed by NextSTEP. It is currently in the initial planning stage.

Progress 
By August 2016, the first phase of NextSTEP had been completed and negotiations with the companies for NextSTEP-2 agreements were started. In March 2017, the proposed development of the Deep Space Transport vehicle was announced.

In August 2017 the Ad Astra Rocket Company reported completing its Year 2 milestones for the VASIMR electric plasma rocket engine.

In March 2019 NASA announced that NextSTEP-2 ground prototypes have been delivered to several of its sites for testing. The prototypes are full size. The fittings include environmental control and life support systems, avionics, sleeping quarters, exercise equipment, and communal areas.

Funding summary 
The funding of all Exploration partners for each phase of the NextSTEP program is as follows

See also 
 Commercial Orbital Transportation Services
 Commercial Resupply Services
 Commercial Crew Development
 Deep Space Habitat
 Deep Space Transport
 Lunar Gateway
 International Space Station

Notes

References

External links 
 NASA NextSTEP webpage

Human spaceflight
NASA programs
Private spaceflight
Deep Space Habitat